Masayo Yamamoto  is a Japanese novelist. She is best known for her 1983 , which won the Bungei Prize.

Biography 
Yamamoto was born on August 18, 1960, in Kanagawa prefecture, Japan. She attended Tsuda University, and her novel  won the Bungei Prize while she was in school. In 1995 she won the Mishima Yukio Prize for her novel Midori-iro no Nigotta Ocha Arui wa Kōfuku no Sampo-michi (緑色の濁ったお茶あるいは幸福の散歩道).

Selected works 

 , 1983
 , 1986
 , 1987
 Midori-iro no Nigotta Ocha Arui wa Kōfuku no Sampo-michi (緑色の濁ったお茶あるいは幸福の散歩道), 1995
 , 1996

References 

1960 births
Living people
Writers from Kanagawa Prefecture
Tsuda University alumni
20th-century Japanese novelists
Yukio Mishima Prize winners